The abbreviation MACP can refer to:

Master, American College of Physicians
Master of Arts in Counseling Psychology
Master of Arts in Community Psychology
Military Aid to the Civil Power
Modern Army Combatives Program
Music Authors' Copyright Protection
Mobile Associate Communication Platform
Mincra Arreta che Palone